Chlorine trifluoride is an interhalogen compound with the formula ClF3. This colorless, poisonous, corrosive, and extremely reactive gas condenses to a pale-greenish yellow liquid, the form in which it is most often sold (pressurized at room temperature). The compound is primarily of interest in plasmaless cleaning and etching operations in the semiconductor industry, in nuclear reactor fuel processing, historically as a component in rocket fuels, and various other industrial operations owing to its corrosive nature.

Preparation, structure, and properties 
It was first reported in 1930 by Ruff and Krug who prepared it by fluorination of chlorine; this also produced ClF (chlorine monofluoride) and the mixture was separated by distillation.
3 F2 + Cl2 → 2 ClF3
The molecular geometry of ClF3 is approximately T-shaped, with one short bond (1.598 Å) and two long bonds (1.698 Å). This structure agrees with the prediction of VSEPR theory, which predicts lone pairs of electrons as occupying two equatorial positions of a hypothetic trigonal bipyramid. The elongated Cl-F axial bonds are consistent with hypervalent bonding.

Reactions 
Reactions with many metals give chlorides and fluorides. With phosphorus, it yields phosphorus trichloride (PCl3) and phosphorus pentafluoride (PF5), while sulfur yields sulfur dichloride (SCl2) and sulfur tetrafluoride (SF4). ClF3 also reacts with water to give hydrogen fluoride and hydrogen chloride, along with oxygen and oxygen difluoride (OF2):

ClF3 + H2O → HF + HCl + OF2
ClF3 + 2H2O → 3HF + HCl + O2.

It will also convert many metal oxides to metal halides and oxygen or oxygen difluoride.

It occurs as a ligand in the complex .

One of the main uses of ClF3 is to produce uranium hexafluoride, UF6, as part of nuclear fuel processing and reprocessing, by the fluorination of uranium metal:

U + 3 ClF3 → UF6 + 3 ClF.

The compound can also dissociate under the scheme:

ClF3 → ClF + F2.

Uses

Semiconductor industry 
In the semiconductor industry, chlorine trifluoride is used to clean chemical vapour deposition chambers. It has the advantage that it can be used to remove semiconductor material from the chamber walls without the need to dismantle the chamber. Unlike most of the alternative chemicals used in this role, it does not need to be activated by the use of plasma since the heat of the chamber is sufficient to make it decompose and react with the semiconductor material.

Rocket propellant 
Chlorine trifluoride has been investigated as a high-performance storable oxidizer in rocket propellant systems. Handling concerns, however, severely limit its use. The following passage by rocket scientist John D. Clark is widely quoted in descriptions of the substance's extremely hazardous nature:

It is, of course, extremely toxic, but that's the least of the problem. It is hypergolic with every known fuel, and so rapidly hypergolic that no ignition delay has ever been measured. It is also hypergolic with such things as cloth, wood, and test engineers, not to mention asbestos, sand, and water—with which it reacts explosively. It can be kept in some of the ordinary structural metals—steel, copper, aluminum, etc.—because of the formation of a thin film of insoluble metal fluoride that protects the bulk of the metal, just as the invisible coat of oxide on aluminum keeps it from burning up in the atmosphere. If, however, this coat is melted or scrubbed off, and has no chance to reform, the operator is confronted with the problem of coping with a metal-fluorine fire. For dealing with this situation, I have always recommended a good pair of running shoes.

Chlorine pentafluoride (ClF5) has also been investigated as a potential rocket oxidizer. It offered improved specific impulse over chlorine trifluoride, but with all of the same difficulties in handling. Neither compound has been used in any operational rocket propulsion system.

Proposed military applications 
Under the code name N-Stoff ("substance N"), chlorine trifluoride was investigated for military applications by the Kaiser Wilhelm Institute in Nazi Germany not long before the start of World War II. Tests were made against mock-ups of the Maginot Line fortifications, and it was found to be an extremely effective incendiary weapon and poison gas. From 1938, construction commenced on a partly bunkered, partly subterranean  munitions factory, the Falkenhagen industrial complex, which was intended to produce 90 tonnes of N-Stoff per month, in addition to sarin (a deadly nerve agent). However, by the time it was captured by the advancing Red Army in 1945, the factory had produced only about 30 to 50 tonnes, at a cost of over 100 German Reichsmark per kilogram. N-Stoff was never used in war.

Hazards 
ClF3 is a very strong oxidizer, specifically a fluorinating agent. It is extremely reactive with most inorganic and organic materials, and will combust many otherwise non-flammable materials without any ignition source. These reactions are often violent, and in some cases explosive, especially with flammable materials. Steel, copper, and nickel are not consumed because a passivation layer of insoluble metal fluoride will form which prevents further corrosion, but molybdenum, tungsten, and titanium are unsuitable as the fluorides that they form are volatile. Any equipment that comes into contact with ClF3 must be meticulously cleaned and then passivated, because any contamination left may burn through the unfluorinated material faster than it can re-form. ClF3 will quickly corrode even noble metals like iridium, platinum, or gold, oxidizing them to chlorides and fluorides.

This oxidizing power, surpassing that of oxygen, causes ClF3 to react vigorously with many other materials often thought of as incombustible and refractory. It is known to ignite sand, asbestos, glass, and even ashes of substances that have already burned in oxygen. In one particular industrial accident, a spill of 900 kg of ClF3 burned through 30 cm of concrete and 90 cm of gravel beneath. There is exactly one known fire control/suppression method capable of dealing with ClF3 – flooding the fire with noble gases such as nitrogen or argon. Barring that, the area must simply be kept cool until the reaction ceases. The compound reacts with water-based suppressors and CO2, rendering them counterproductive.

Exposure to larger amounts of ClF3, as a liquid or as a gas, ignites living tissue, resulting in severe chemical and thermal burns. ClF3 reacts violently with water and exposure to the reaction also results in burns. The products of hydrolysis are mainly hydrofluoric acid and hydrochloric acid, which are usually released as steam or vapor due to the highly exothermic nature of the reaction.

See also 
 Dioxygen difluoride
 Chlorine fluoride
 List of stoffs

Notes 
 Using data from Economic History Services and The Inflation Calculator, we can calculate that 100 Reichsmark in 1941 is approximately equivalent to $4,652.50 USD in 2021. Reichsmark exchange rate values from 1942 to 1944 are fragmentary.

References

Further reading

External links 
 National Pollutant Inventory – Fluoride and compounds fact sheet
 NIST Standard Reference Database
 CDC – NIOSH Pocket Guide to Chemical Hazards – Chlorine Trifluoride
 WebElements
 Sand Won't Save You This Time, blog post by Derek Lowe on the hazards of handling ClF3

Fluorides
Interhalogen compounds
Inorganic chlorine compounds
Incendiary weapons
Rocket oxidizers
Fluorinating agents
Oxidizing agents
Chlorine(III) compounds
Substances discovered in the 1930s